Arch Heath (July 15, 1890 – January 7, 1945), also known as A. B. Heath and Arch B. Heath, was an American film director and screenwriter whose career spanned from the era of silent films to the 1940s. He helped pioneer the introduction of the sound film. Many of his early films are now considered lost.

Heath was born in Brooklyn. Before starting as a director, Heath played semi-pro baseball.  He learned drawing as an office boy for a newspaper, and became a cartoonist for the sports page, finally succeeding Herbert Johnson at the Associated Newspapers Syndicate, signing his cartoons "Fields".

He started in movies by creating campaign films for the presidential campaign of Woodrow Wilson in 1914.
From cartooning he also moved on to movie animation. He became general manager of production at Eastern Film Corporation, based in New York City. At Eastern he produced his first serial A Daughter of Uncle Sam, directed by James C. Morton, in 1918.

He moved to Pathé Studios in New York. He directed his first serial, The Masked Menace, in 1927. In 1930, when the studio moved to Hollywood, Heath was appointed "production manager of all two-reel comedies."

The Heath-directed 1928 film Melody of Love was "Universal's first 100 percent talkie feature," and "also may have been the first all-talking movie musical."

During World War II Heath produced films for the Signal Corps and the Office of War Information. He died at home in New York City on January 7, 1945. The Screen Writers Guild created the "Robert Meltzer Award" in honor of Heath, Meltzer and three others for "the writing of an American Film which, in addition to its value as entertainment, most effectively contributes to a better understanding or world problems."

Filmography

Director
 Beyond the Great Wall, 1920, Eastern Productions, as A.B. Heath
 On Guard, 1927, Pathé, as Arch B. Heath (serial, 10 chapters)
 The Crimson Flash, 1927, Pathé, as Arch B. Heath (serial, 10 chapters) 
 The Masked Menace, 1927, Pathé (serial, 10 chapters) 
 Came the Dawn, 1928, Hal Roach Studios (with Leo McCarey) 
 Mark of the Frog, 1928, Pathé, (serial, 10 chapters)
 That Night, 1928, Hal Roach Studios (with Leo McCarey)
 Melody of Love, 1928, Universal
 Modern Love, 1929, Universal (part-talkie)
 Chills and Fever, 1930, Pathé, as Arch B. Heath—writer and director
 Doctor's Orders, 1930, Hal Roach Studios
 Dangerous Youth, 1930, Pathé, as Arch B. Heath
 Against the Rules, 1931, RKO Pathé Pictures, as Arch B. Heath—writer and director

Writer
 The Scarlet West, 1925, First National Pictures, as A.B. Heath
 It Can Be Done, 1929, Universal, as A.B. Heath
 Ride 'em Cowboy, 1930, Pathé, as Arch B. Heath—writer and director
 Chills and Fever, 1930, Pathé, as Arch B. Heath—writer and director
 Hearts and Hoofs, 1930,  Pathé, (short, as Arch B. Heath)
 Against the Rules, 1931,  RKO Pathé Pictures, (short, as Arch B. Heath)
The Adventures of Captain Marvel, 1941, Republic (serial, 12 chapters)
White Eagle, 1941, Columbia (serial, 15 chapters)
 Against the Rules, 1931,  RKO Pathé Pictures, (short, as Arch B. Heath)

Other
Show Boat, 1929, Universal (sound supervision,prologue directed by Arch Heath)

References

External links

1890 births
1945 deaths
American film directors
American male screenwriters
People of the United States Office of War Information
20th-century American male writers
20th-century American screenwriters